Susan Marie Shields (born February 3, 1952), also known by her married name Susan White, is an American former competition swimmer and Olympic medalist.  She represented the United States as a 16-year-old at the 1968 Summer Olympics in Mexico City, where she received a bronze medal for her third-place performance in the women's 100-meter butterfly, finishing behind Australian Lyn McClements and fellow American Ellie Daniel.

Shields was born in Erie, Pennsylvania, but moved to Louisville, Kentucky with her family at a young age.  She retired from competition swimming after graduating from high school.  She later earned a bachelor's degree in elementary education from the University of Louisville, and has worked as a teacher and swim coach.

See also
 List of Olympic medalists in swimming (women)
 List of University of Louisville people

References

External links
  Susan Shields – Olympic athlete profile at Sports-Reference.com

1952 births
Living people
American female butterfly swimmers
Olympic bronze medalists for the United States in swimming
Sportspeople from Erie, Pennsylvania
Sportspeople from Louisville, Kentucky
Swimmers at the 1968 Summer Olympics
University of Louisville alumni
Medalists at the 1968 Summer Olympics
21st-century American women